Greul may refer to:
Simon Greul, retired German tennis player
Greul River, tributary of the Pârâul Negru in Romania

See also
 Gruel